The Battle of Sacile (16 April 1809) saw the Franco-Italian Army of Italy commanded by Eugène de Beauharnais face the Archduke John of Austria's Army of Inner Austria during the War of the Fifth Coalition. Believing that he was only opposed by the Austrian VIII Armeekorps, Eugène launched his right wing in a heavy attack against it. In the morning, the Austrians successfully held off Franco-Italian assaults on their left flank as Eugène reinforced the attack with troops from his left wing. Later in the day, John counterattacked Eugène's weakened left wing with the IX Armeekorps, forcing the Franco-Italian army to withdraw from the battlefield. The battle at Sacile was preceded by the action of Pordenone on 15 April in which the Austrian advance guard mauled the French rear guard. The Austrian victory compelled Eugène to retreat to the Adige River at Verona where he gathered reinforcements and planned a counteroffensive.

Franco-Italian Army Order of Battle

Franco-Italian Army at Sacile

Army of Italy: Eugène de Beauharnais 
 Chief of staff: General of Division Henri François Marie Charpentier
 Artillery: General of Division Jean-Barthélemot Sorbier (8 guns)
 2nd Foot Artillery Regiment, 1st Company (250 men, six 12-pound cannons, two 5-inch 7 li. howitzers)
 1st Division: General of Division Jean Mathieu Seras
 1st Brigade: General of Brigade Louis Gareau
 35th Line Infantry Regiment (2,800 in 4 battalions)
 53rd Line Infantry Regiment (2,800 in 4 battalions)
 2nd Brigade: General of Brigade Jean-Claude Roussel
 106th Line Infantry Regiment (2,800 in 4 battalions)
 Attached Artillery: (12 guns)
 Foot artillery company (four 8-pound cannons, two 6-inch howitzers)
 Foot artillery company (four 4-pound cannons, two 6-inch howitzers)

 2nd Division: General of Division Jean-Baptiste Broussier
 1st Brigade: General of Brigade Joseph Marie, Count Dessaix
 9th Line Infantry Regiment (2,800 in 4 battalions)
 2nd Brigade: General of Brigade Jacques Dutruy
 84th Line Infantry Regiment (2,800 in 4 battalions)
 92nd Line Infantry Regiment (2,800 in 4 battalions)
 24th Dragoon Regiment (125 in the 4th Squadron)
 Attached Artillery: (12 guns)
 Foot artillery company (four 8-pound cannons, two 6-inch howitzers)
 Foot artillery company (four 4-pound cannons, two 6-inch howitzers)

 3rd Division: General of Division Paul Grenier
 1st Brigade: General of Brigade Louis Jean Nicolas Abbé
 1st Light Infantry Regiment (700 in the 4th Battalion)
 1st Line Infantry Regiment (2,800 in 4 battalions)
 2nd Brigade: General of Brigade François-Antoine Teste
 52nd Line Infantry Regiment (2,800 in 4 battalions)
 102nd Line Infantry Regiment (2,800 in 4 battalions)
 Napoleone Italian Dragoon Regiment (125 in the 4th Squadron)
 Attached Artillery: (12 guns)
 Foot artillery company (six 8-pound cannons)
 Foot artillery company (four 4-pound cannons, two 6-inch howitzers)

 4th Division: General of Division Gabriel Barbou des Courières
 1st Brigade: General of Brigade Jean-Claude Moreau
 8th Light Infantry Regiment (1,450 in the 3rd & 4th Battalions)
 18th Light Infantry Regiment (1,400 in the 3rd & 4th Battalions)
 5th Line Infantry Regiment (1,400 in the 3rd & 4th Battalions)
 11th Line Infantry Regiment (700 in the 4th Battalion)
 2nd Brigade: General of Brigade Claude Roize
 23rd Line Infantry Regiment (1,400 in the 3rd & 4th Battalions)
 60th Line Infantry Regiment (1,400 in the 3rd & 4th Battalions)
 79th Line Infantry Regiment (1,350 in the 3rd & 4th Battalions)
 87th Line Infantry Regiment (1,400 in the 3rd & 4th Battalions)
 Attached Artillery: (12 guns)
 Foot artillery company (four 8-pound cannons, two 6-inch howitzers)
 Foot artillery company (four 4-pound cannons, two 6-inch howitzers)

 Light Cavalry Division: General of Division Louis Michel Antoine Sahuc
 Brigade: General of Brigade Joseph Pagès
 6th Chasseurs à Cheval Regiment (600 in 4 squadrons)
 8th Chasseurs à Cheval Regiment (850 in 4 squadrons)
 25th Chasseurs à Cheval Regiment (600 in 4 squadrons)
 6th Hussar Regiment (750 in 4 squadrons)
 Attached Artillery: (6 guns)
 Horse artillery company (four 4-pound cannons, two 6-inch howitzers)
 1st Italian Division: General of Division Filippo Severoli
 1st Brigade: General of Brigade Antoine-Louis-Ignace Bonfanti
 1st Italian Line Infantry Regiment (2,800 in 4 battalions)
 2nd Italian Line Infantry Regiment (700 in the 3rd Battalion)
 2nd Brigade: General of Brigade Luigi Gaspare Peyri
 7th Italian Line Infantry Regiment (2,100 in the 2nd, 3rd & 4th Battalions)
 Dalmatian Infantry Regiment (1,400 in 2 battalions)
 Italian Chasseurs à Cheval Regiment (125 in 1 squadron)
 Attached Artillery: (12 guns, 450)
 Italian foot artillery company (four 6-pound cannons, two 6-inch howitzers)
 Italian foot artillery company (four 6-pound cannons, two 6-inch howitzers)

Not present at Sacile
 
 2nd Italian Division: General of Division Achille Fontanelli
 1st Brigade: General of Brigade Joseph François Benigne Julhien
 1st Italian Light Infantry Regiment (1,400 in 2 battalions)
 2nd Italian Light Infantry Regiment (1,400 in 2 battalions)
 3rd Italian Line Infantry Regiment (2,800 in 4 battalions)
 2nd Brigade: General of Brigade Antoine Marc Augustin Bertoletti
 4th Italian Line Infantry Regiment (1,400 in 2 battalions)
 Istrian Jagers (700 in 1 battalion)
 Italian Chasseurs à Cheval Regiment (250 in 2 squadrons)
 Attached Artillery: (12 guns, 450)
 Italian foot artillery company (four 6-pound cannons, two 6-inch howitzers)
 Italian foot artillery company (four 6-pound cannons, two 6-inch howitzers)
 
 Division Lamarque: General of Division Jean Maximilien Lamarque
 1st Brigade: General of Brigade Léonard Huard de Saint-Aubin
 13th Line Infantry Regiment (2,800 in 4 battalions)
 112th Line Infantry Regiment (2,100 in 3 battalions)
 2nd Brigade: General of Brigade Louis Alméras
 29th Line Infantry Regiment (2,800 in 4 battalions)
 42nd Line Infantry Regiment (700 in the 4th Battalion)
 Attached Artillery: (12 guns)
 Foot artillery company (four 8-pound cannons, two 6-inch howitzers, 200)
 Foot artillery company (four 4-pound cannons, two 6-inch howitzers, 140)

 1st Dragoon Division: General of Division Emmanuel Grouchy
 Brigade: General of Brigade François Guerin d'Etoquigny
 7th Dragoon Regiment (700 in 4 squadrons)
 30th Dragoon Regiment (950 in 4 squadrons)
 Reine Dragoon Regiment (700 in 4 squadrons)
 Attached Artillery: (6 guns)
 Horse artillery company (four 4-pound cannons, two 6-inch howitzers, 125)
 2nd Dragoon Division: General of Division Charles Joseph Randon de Malboissière de Pully
 Brigade: General of Brigade Pierre Poinsot
 23rd Dragoon Regiment (600 in 4 squadrons)
 28th Dragoon Regiment (450 in 4 squadrons)
 29th Dragoon Regiment (600 in 4 squadrons)
 
 Division Durutte: General of Division Pierre François Joseph Durutte
 1st Brigade:
 22nd Light Infantry Regiment (1,400 in the 3rd & 4th Battalions)
 23rd Line Infantry Regiment (2,800 in 4 battalions)
 2nd Brigade:
 62nd Line Infantry Regiment (2,800 in 4 battalions)
 Attached Artillery: (6 guns)
 Foot artillery company (four 6-pound cannons, two 6-inch howitzers)
 Royal Italian Guard: General of Brigade Teodoro Lechi
 1st Brigade: General of Brigade Pietro Luigi Viani
 Guard Velites Infantry Regiment (800 in 1 battalion)
 Guards d'Honneur Squadron (175)
 2nd Brigade: General of Brigade Teodoro Lechi
 Guard Chasseurs Infantry Regiment (800 in 1 battalion)
 Guard Grenadiers Infantry Regiment (800 in 1 battalion)
 Guard Dragoon Regiment (275 in 2 squadrons)
 Attached Artillery: (6 guns, 238)
 Italian foot artillery company (four 6-pound cannons, two 6-inch howitzers)
 Sappers (350 in 3 companies)

Austrian Army Order of Battle

Army of Inner Austria: General der Kavallerie Archduke John of Austria
 Chief of staff: Oberst (colonel) Laval Nugent von Westmeath
 Artillery Director: General-Major Anton Reisner
 Advance Guard: Feldmarschall-Leutnant Johann Maria Philipp Frimont
 Brigade: General-Major Josef Schmidt
 Archduke Franz Karl Infantry Regiment Nr. 52 (1 battalion)
 Franz Jellacic Infantry Regiment Nr. 62 (1 battalion)
 Brigade: General-Major Joseph Wetzel
 1st Banal Grenz Infantry Regiment Nr. 10 (1⅔ battalions)
 Ott Hussar Regiment Nr. 5 (2 squadrons)

 VIII Armeekorps: Feldmarschall-Leutnant Albert Gyulai
 Corps Artillery: Major Johann von Fasching
 12-pound position battery (6 guns)
 3-pound brigade battery (8 guns)
 Brigade: General-Major Hieronymus Karl Graf von Colloredo-Mansfeld
 Strassoldo Infantry Regiment Nr. 27 (2 battalions)
 Saint-Julien Infantry Regiment Nr. 61 (2 battalions)
 3-pound brigade battery (8 guns)
 Brigade: General-Major Anton Gajoli
 Franz Jellacic Infantry Regiment Nr. 62 (2 battalions)
 Johann Jellacic Infantry Regiment Nr. 53 (2 battalions)
 2nd Banal Grenz Infantry Regiment Nr. 11 (1 battalion)
 half Grenz 3-pound brigade battery (4 guns)
 Brigade: Oberst Wilhelm von Fulda
 Ott Hussar Regiment Nr. 5 (4 squadrons)
 Hohenzollern Chevau-léger Regiment Nr. 2 (4 squadrons)

 IX Armeekorps: Feldmarschall-Leutnant Ignaz Gyulai
 Corps Artillery: Oberstleutnant Johann von Callot
 12-pound position battery (6 guns)
 6-pound brigade battery (8 guns)
 3-pound brigade battery (8 guns)
 Brigade: General-Major Johann Kalnássy
 Simbschen Infantry Regiment Nr. 43 (3 battalions)
 3-pound brigade battery (8 guns)
 Brigade: General-Major Alois von Gavasini
 Reisky Infantry Regiment Nr. 13 (3 battalions)
 Ottocaner Grenz Infantry Regiment Nr. 2 (1½ battalions)
 Brigade: General-Major Franz Marziani
 Alvinczi Infantry Regiment Nr. 19 (3 battalions)
 Oguliner Grenz Infantry Regiment Nr. 3 (2 battalions)
 3-pound brigade battery (8 guns)
 Detachment: Oberst Anton Volkmann
 Banal Grenz Infantry Regiment Nr. 2 (1 battalion)
 Johann Jellacic Infantry Regiment Nr. 53 (1 battalion)
 Ott Hussar Regiment # 5 (2 squadrons)
 Archduke Joseph Hussar Regiment Nr. 2 (2 squadrons)
 Brigade: General-Major Johann Peter Kleinmayer
 Szluiner Grenz Infantry Regiment Nr. 4 (2 battalions)
 Salamon Grenadier Battalion
 Janusch Grenadier Battalion
 Chimani Grenadier Battalion
 Mühlen Grenadier Battalion
 3-pound brigade battery (8 guns)
 Brigade: General-Major Ignaz Sebottendorf
 Graz Landwehr (3 battalions)
 Dumontet Freikorps battalion
 Cavalry Division: Feldmarschall-Leutnant Christian Wolfskeel von Reichenberg
 Brigade: General-Major Ignaz Splényi
 Frimont Hussar Regiment Nr. 9 (4 squadrons)
 Archduke Joseph Hussar Regiment Nr. 2 (6 squadrons)
 Brigade: General-Major Johann Hager von Altensteig
 Hohenlohe Dragoon Regiment Nr. 2 (6 squadrons)
 Savoy Dragoon Regiment Nr. 5 (6 squadrons)

Notes

References
 Arnold, James R. Napoleon Conquers Austria. Westport, Conn.: Praeger Publishers, 1995. 
 Bowden, Scotty & Tarbox, Charlie. Armies on the Danube 1809. Arlington, Texas: Empire Games Press, 1980. OCLC 6649795.
 Nagy, Istvan. napoleon-series.org Austrian Cavalry Regiments and Their Commanders 1792–1815: The Hussars
 Schneid, Frederick C. Napoleon's Italian Campaigns: 1805–1815. Westport, Conn.: Praeger Publishers, 2002. 
 Smith, Digby. The Napoleonic Wars Data Book. London: Greenhill, 1998. 
 Smith, Digby & Kudrna, Leopold. napoleon-series.org Austrian Generals: 1792–1815

Napoleonic Wars orders of battle
Battles of the War of the Fifth Coalition